Vector Lovers is the moniker used by British electronic music producer Martin Wheeler.  Wheeler, as described by Soma Records (his current label) is a "computer nerd" and "80s-obsessed knob-twiddler" and creates music which falls into the intelligent dance music (IDM) and electro genres.  His music has been compared to and is influenced by such acts as Kraftwerk and Depeche Mode.

As Vector Lovers, Wheeler has released several singles and EPs, as well as four albums. Early Vector Lovers' releases were through his own Iwari record label (one very early release was made as 'Balloon' - the name was changed to Vector Lovers when he discovered that there already was a band called Balloon). Music has also been released under the names Rosenbaum and Badly Born Droid.

In 2006, Wheeler contributed production duties to Tracey Thorn's album Out of the Woods, released in March 2007.

Discography

Albums
Vector Lovers (2004)
Capsule For One (2005)
Afterglow (2007)
Electrospective (2011)
iPhonica (2013)
Capsule For One (Special Edition) (2022)

EPs
Roboto Ashido Funk (2003)
Electrobotik Disco (2004)
Suicide Android (2004)
Comptrfnk (2005)
Boulevard (2005)
Microtron (2005)
Piano Dust (2007)
Raumklang (2008)
Ping Pong (2008)
Remixed & Remastered 01 (2011)
Solistice (2015)
Carousel (2016)
Pale Blue Star (2017)
Road / To Ruin (2018)

Singles
"Post Arctic Industries" (2006)
"A Field" (2007)
"Late Shift" / "Babette" (2008)
"Night Train Memories" (2012)
"Kissing Princess Leia" (2015 mix) (2015)
"Night Riding (Crash Premonition)" (2017)

References

External links
Vector Lovers on Myspace
Vector Lovers Official Site
Vector Lovers Bandcamp

British electronic musicians
British record producers